Houston Jerami Grant (born March 12, 1994) is an American professional basketball player for the Portland Trail Blazers of the National Basketball Association (NBA). He played college basketball for the Syracuse Orange and was drafted by the Philadelphia 76ers in the second round of the 2014 NBA draft. Grant also played for the Oklahoma City Thunder, Denver Nuggets, and Detroit Pistons. He won a gold medal with the 2020 U.S. Olympic team.

High school career
Grant attended DeMatha Catholic High School in Hyattsville, Maryland, where as a senior in 2011–12, he averaged 12.5 points in 23 games.

Considered a four-star recruit by ESPN.com, Grant was listed as the No. 11 power forward and the No. 37 player in the nation in 2012.

College career
At Syracuse, Grant averaged 12.1 points, 6.8 rebounds and 1.4 assists in 31.4 minutes per game in 2013–14 while shooting 49.6% from the floor; he also scored in double figures in 24 of 32 games played and posted 19 points three times. Further, he was a 2014 All-ACC Honorable Mention selection.

In April 2014, Grant declared for the NBA draft, forgoing his final two years of college eligibility. He started off as a Guard but, for his defensive skills, he moved to the Small Forward position.

Professional career

Philadelphia 76ers (2014–2016)
On June 26, 2014, Grant was selected in the second round of that year's NBA draft with the 39th overall pick by the Philadelphia 76ers, and he joined the team for the 2014 NBA Summer League. On September 29, 2014, he signed a four-year deal with the franchise, with two them being guaranteed. On January 21, 2015, he came away with eight blocks in a loss to the New York Knicks; this was the most blocks in a game for a 76er since Samuel Dalembert had nine on December 12, 2007, as well as the most by a 76er rookie since Shawn Bradley had nine on January 17, 1994. On February 2, he had a season-best game with 18 points and 7 rebounds in a loss to the Cleveland Cavaliers.

In July 2015, Grant re-joined the 76ers for the 2015 NBA Summer League. On November 11, 2015, he recorded his first career double-double with 12 points and 10 rebounds, coming in a loss to the Toronto Raptors. On December 30, he posted a then career-high 11 rebounds to go along with 16 points and five blocks in a 110–105 win over the Sacramento Kings.

Oklahoma City Thunder (2016–2019)

On November 1, 2016, Grant was traded to the Oklahoma City Thunder in exchange for Ersan İlyasova and a protected draft pick. He made his debut for the Thunder the following day in an 85–83 win over the Los Angeles Clippers, recording six points, two rebounds, and two blocks in 18 minutes off the bench. On December 19, 2016, he scored a season-high 15 points in a 110–108 loss to the Atlanta Hawks. On February 1, 2017, he tied his season high mark with 15 points in a 128–100 loss to the Chicago Bulls.

On October 31, 2017, Grant scored 17 points off the bench in a 110–91 win over the Milwaukee Bucks. He finished 5 of 9 from the floor to record 17 points for the first time since April 1, 2016.

On July 7, 2018, Grant re-signed with the Thunder. On January 10, 2019, he scored a then career-high 25 points to go with 12 rebounds in a 154–147 double-overtime loss to the San Antonio Spurs. On March 18, he scored 27 points in a 116–107 loss to the Miami Heat. On April 10, he set a then career-high with 28 points in a 127–116 win over the Bucks.

Denver Nuggets (2019–2020)
On July 8, 2019, Grant was traded to the Denver Nuggets for a 2020 first-round pick.

On February 25, 2020, Grant scored a then career-high 29 points in a 115–98 win over the Detroit Pistons. On September 15, 2020, in a Game 7 win against the favored Clippers, Grant outscored Paul George 14 to 10 while playing 9 minutes less. However, he struggled against LeBron James and Anthony Davis in the Western Conference Finals, as the Nuggets fell to the Los Angeles Lakers in five games. Grant scored 26 points in the Nuggets' Game 3 victory. Grant averaged 11.6 points and 3.3 rebounds in the playoffs.

Detroit Pistons (2020–2022)
On November 22, 2020, Grant signed a three-year, $60 million contract with the Detroit Pistons through a sign-and-trade with the Denver Nuggets. Detroit also received draft rights to 2015 second-round pick Nikola Radičević in exchange for cash considerations. On February 17, 2021, Grant scored a then career-high 43 points in a 105–102 loss to the Chicago Bulls. Grant ended the season as a Most Improved Player award finalist, finishing second behind Julius Randle, while averaging a career high in points per game.

On December 10, 2021, in a 93–109 loss to the New Orleans Pelicans, Grant suffered a right thumb injury. On December 16, he underwent surgery to repair the ulnar collateral ligament (UCL) in his right thumb and was ruled out for at least six weeks. On March 28, 2022, Grant was ruled out for the remainder of the season with a calf strain.

Portland Trail Blazers (2022–present)

On July 6, 2022, Grant was traded to the Portland Trail Blazers, along with the draft rights to Ismaël Kamagate, in exchange for a top-four protected 2025 first-round pick (via Milwaukee), the draft rights to Gabriele Procida, and two future second round picks. On October 23, Grant put up 16 points, along with a game-winning layup in a 106–104 win over the Los Angeles Lakers. On November 4, Grant scored 30 points and hit a game-winning jumper in a 108–106 win over the Phoenix Suns. On November 25, Grant scored a career-high 44 points in a 132–129 overtime win over the New York Knicks.

National team career
On June 28, 2021, Grant played as a member of the 2020 U.S. Olympic team that won a gold medal in Tokyo.

Career statistics

NBA

Regular season

|-
| style="text-align:left;"|
| style="text-align:left;"|Philadelphia
| 65 || 11 || 21.2 || .352 || .228 || .591 || 3.0 || 1.2 || .6 || 1.0 || 6.3
|-
| style="text-align:left;"|
| style="text-align:left;"|Philadelphia
| 77 || 52 || 26.8 || .419 || .240 || .658 || 4.7 || 1.8 || .7 || 1.6 || 9.7
|-
| style="text-align:left;"|
| style="text-align:left;"|Philadelphia
| 2 || 0 || 20.5 || .353 || .000 || .500 || 3.5 || .0 || .0 || 2.0 || 8.0
|-
| style="text-align:left;"|
| style="text-align:left;"|Oklahoma City
| 78 || 4 || 19.1 || .469 || .377 || .619 || 2.6 || .6 || .4 || 1.0 || 5.4
|-
| style="text-align:left;"|
| style="text-align:left;"|Oklahoma City
| 81 || 1 || 20.3 || .535 || .291 || .675 || 3.9 || .7 || .4 || 1.0 || 8.4
|-
| style="text-align:left;"|
| style="text-align:left;"|Oklahoma City
| 80 || 77 || 32.7 || .497 || .392 || .710 || 5.2 || 1.0 || .8 || 1.3 || 13.6
|-
| style="text-align:left;"|
| style="text-align:left;"|Denver
| 71 || 24 || 26.6 || .478 || .389 || .750 || 3.5 || 1.2 || .7 || .8 || 12.0
|-
| style="text-align:left;"|
| style="text-align:left;"|Detroit
| 54 || 54 || 33.9 || .429 || .350 || .845 || 4.6 || 2.8 || .6 || 1.1 || 22.3
|-
| style="text-align:left;"|
| style="text-align:left;"|Detroit
| 47 || 47 || 31.9 || .426 || .358 || .838 || 4.1 || 2.4 || .9 || 1.0 || 19.2
|- class="sortbottom"
| style="text-align:center;" colspan="2"|Career
| 555 || 270 || 26.0 || .452 || .349 || .723 || 3.9 || 1.3 || .6 || 1.1 || 11.4

Playoffs

|-
| style="text-align:left;"|2017
| style="text-align:left;"|Oklahoma City
| 5 || 0 || 22.2 || .613 || .333 || .857 || 3.8 || .8 || .2 || .4 || 9.2
|-
| style="text-align:left;"|2018
| style="text-align:left;"|Oklahoma City
| 6 || 0 || 22.2 || .514 || .250 || .455 || 3.3 || 1.0 || .7 || .5 || 7.2
|-
| style="text-align:left;"|2019
| style="text-align:left;"|Oklahoma City
| 5 || 5 || 35.2 || .500 || .450 || .692 || 5.6 || .8 || .6 || 2.0 || 11.6
|-
| style="text-align:left;"|2020
| style="text-align:left;"|Denver
| 19 || 16 || 34.4 || .406 || .326 || .889 || 3.3 || 1.3 || .6 || .8 || 11.6
|- class="sortbottom"
| style="text-align:center;" colspan="2"|Career
| 35 || 21 || 30.7 || .456 || .341 || .800 || 3.7 || 1.1 || .5 || .9 || 10.5

College

|-
| style="text-align:left;"|2012–13
| style="text-align:left;"|Syracuse
| 40 || 9 || 14.3 || .462 || .400 || .562 || 3.0 || .5 || .4 || .5 || 3.9
|-
| style="text-align:left;"|2013–14
| style="text-align:left;"|Syracuse
| 32 || 20 || 31.4 || .496 || .000 || .674 || 6.8 || 1.4 || .8 || .6 || 12.1
|- class="sortbottom"
| style="text-align:center;" colspan="2"|Career
| 72 || 29 || 21.9 || .486 || .300 || .641 || 4.7 || .9 || .6 || .5 || 7.5

Personal life
Grant is the son of Beverly and Harvey Grant (a former NBA player), and has three brothers: Jerai, Jerian and Jaelin. Grant's uncle, Horace (twin brother of Harvey), played college basketball at Clemson and was a four-time NBA champion with the Chicago Bulls and Los Angeles Lakers. Two of his brothers, Jerai and Jerian, are also professional basketball players.

References

External links

Syracuse Orange bio
USA Basketball bio

1994 births
Living people
African-American basketball players
American men's basketball players
Basketball players at the 2020 Summer Olympics
Basketball players from Maryland
Basketball players from Portland, Oregon
DeMatha Catholic High School alumni
Denver Nuggets players
Detroit Pistons players
Medalists at the 2020 Summer Olympics
Oklahoma City Thunder players
Olympic gold medalists for the United States in basketball
People from Hyattsville, Maryland
Philadelphia 76ers draft picks
Philadelphia 76ers players
Portland Trail Blazers players
Power forwards (basketball)
Small forwards
Sportspeople from the Washington metropolitan area
Syracuse Orange men's basketball players
United States men's national basketball team players
21st-century African-American sportspeople